The Lilli Lehmann Medal is an award by the Mozarteum International Foundation, named in honour of soprano Lilli Lehmann.

Recipients

Among the people who have received it are:

 Ruth Kemper
 Margaret Halstead, 1933
 Irmgard Seefried
 George Hadjinikos, 1949
 Maria Stader, 1950, 1956
 Hans Braun, 1950
 Julius Patzak, 1950
 Elisabeth Schwarzkopf, 1950
 Ingrid Haebler
 Gwendolin Sims-Warren, 1963
 Rotraud Hansmann, 1966
 Thomas Stumpf, 1972
 Bettina Schoeller
 Evmorfia Metaxaki
 Gustav Kuhn
 Theo Alcántara
 Klaus Jäckle, 1990
 Irena Bespalovaite, 2001
 Sergio Cárdenas, 1975
 Alexandra Bauer, 2003
 Marie-Dominique Ryckmanns, 2022

References

 Hans Braun biography with information about the award
 Thomas Stumpf Biography
 Schoeller bio
 Metaxaki bio
 Hadjinikos bio
 Award to Halstead
Kuhn bio
Jäckle bio
Bespalovaite bio
Cardenas bio (in Spanish)

Austrian music awards